Super Singer may refer to:
 Super Singer (Bengali reality show)
 Super Singer (Tamil reality show):
 Super Singer Junior
 Super Singer T20
 Maa TV Super Singer
 Radio City Super Singer